The Lovelorn is a 1927 American silent drama film directed by John P. McCarthy and written by Frederic Hatton and Bradley King. The film stars Sally O'Neil, Molly O'Day, Larry Kent, James Murray, and Charles Delaney. The film was released on December 17, 1927, by Metro-Goldwyn-Mayer.

Cast 
Sally O'Neil as Georgie Hastings
Molly O'Day as Ann Hastings
Larry Kent as Bill Warren
James Murray as Charlie
Charles Delaney as Jimmy
George Cooper as Joe Sprotte
Allan Forrest as Ernest Brooks
Dorothy Cumming as Beatrice Fairfax
Isabelle Noonan as Young girl (uncredited)

References

External links

Stills at silenthollywood.com

1927 films
1920s English-language films
Silent American drama films
1927 drama films
Metro-Goldwyn-Mayer films
American black-and-white films
American silent feature films
Films directed by John P. McCarthy
1920s American films